A piston pump is a type of positive displacement pump where the high-pressure seal reciprocates with the piston. Piston pumps can be used to move liquids or compress gases. They can operate over a wide range of pressures. High pressure operation can be achieved without adversely affecting flow rate. Piston pumps can also deal with viscous media and media containing solid particles. This pump type functions through a piston cup, oscillation mechanism where down-strokes cause pressure differentials, filling of pump chambers, where up-stroke forces the pump fluid out for use. Piston pumps are often used in scenarios requiring high, consistent pressure and in water irrigation or delivery systems.

Types
The two main types of piston pump are the lift pump and the force pump. Both types may be operated either by hand or by an engine.

Lift pump
In a lift pump, the upstroke of the piston draws water, through a valve, into the lower part of the cylinder. On the downstroke, water passes through valves set in the piston into the upper part of the cylinder. On the next upstroke, water is discharged from the upper part of the cylinder via a spout. This type of pump is limited by the height of water that can be supported by air pressure against a vacuum.

Force pump

In a force pump, the upstroke of the piston draws water, through an inlet valve, into the cylinder. On the downstroke, the water is discharged, through an outlet valve, into the outlet pipe.

Others
 Axial piston pump
 Radial piston pump

See also
 Plunger pump
 Diaphragm pump

References

Pumps